is a railway station on the West Japan Railway Company (JR West) Kansai Main Line (Yamatoji Line) in the city of Yamatokōriyama, Nara Prefecture, Japan. It is administrated by Ōji Station.

Layout

Surroundings
  Route 25

History 
Station numbering was introduced in March 2018 with Yamato-Koizumi being assigned station number JR-Q33.

Adjacent stations

References

External links

Yamato-Koizumi Station

Railway stations in Japan opened in 1920
Railway stations in Nara Prefecture